Hahn Fire Apparatus, also known as Hahn Motors, was a fire engines and apparatus and truck builder formerly located in Hamburg, within Berks County, Pennsylvania. 

It was in operation from 1916 until its closure in 1989.

Products
The company manufactured custom and commercial fire engines and firefighting apparatus.

Hahn manufactured its own chassis for its fire engines. They were also for commercial trucks it built, such as delivery vehicles and construction vehicles.

The company also built buses.

See also

References

Fire service vehicle manufacturers
Emergency services equipment makers
Motor vehicle manufacturers based in Pennsylvania
Defunct motor vehicle manufacturers of the United States
Defunct bus manufacturers of the United States
Companies based in Berks County, Pennsylvania
Vehicle manufacturing companies established in 1916
Vehicle manufacturing companies disestablished in 1989
1916 establishments in Pennsylvania
1989 disestablishments in Pennsylvania
Defunct manufacturing companies based in Pennsylvania
Defunct truck manufacturers of the United States